The 2009–10 UCI Oceania Tour was the sixth season of the UCI Oceania Tour. The season began on 11 October 2009 with the Herald Sun Tour and ended on 31 January 2010 with the Tour of Wellington.

The points leader, based on the cumulative results of previous races, wears the UCI Oceania Tour cycling jersey. Peter McDonald of Australia was the defending champion of the 2008–09 UCI Oceania Tour. Michael Matthews of Australia was crowned as the 2009–10 UCI Oceania Tour champion.

Throughout the season, points are awarded to the top finishers of stages within stage races and the final general classification standings of each of the stages races and one-day events. The quality and complexity of a race also determines how many points are awarded to the top finishers, the higher the UCI rating of a race, the more points are awarded.
The UCI ratings from highest to lowest are as follows:
 Multi-day events: 2.HC, 2.1 and 2.2
 One-day events: 1.HC, 1.1 and 1.2

Events

2009

2010

Final standings

Individual classification

Team classification

Nation classification

Nation under-23 classification

External links
 

UCI Oceania Tour

2010 in Oceanian sport
2009 in Oceanian sport